The QubicaAMF Bowling World Cup, previously known as the International Masters and AMF Bowling World Cup, is an annual Ten-pin bowling championship sponsored by QubicaAMF Worldwide, and the largest in bowling in terms of number of participating nations. Each nation chooses one male and/or one female bowler to represent them in the tournament, and in the majority of cases, this is done by running a qualifying tournament, the winners of which (male and/or female) are chosen.

History
The Bowling World Cup was created by AMF's European Promotions Director at the time, Victor Kalman, and Gordon Caie, AMF's Promotions Manager in the UK at the time. Dublin, Ireland in 1965 hosted the first-ever Bowling World Cup, then called the International Masters. 20 bowlers, all men, participated. Lauri Ajanto became the first-ever winner of the BWC. Women first competed in 1972, the 8th edition of the AMF Bowling World Cup in Hamburg, West Germany where Irma Urrea became the first-ever woman to win the BWC.

13 countries have participated in every Bowling World Cup since its inception: Australia, Belgium, England (as Great Britain from 1965 to 1995), Finland, France, Germany, Ireland, Italy, Mexico, Netherlands, Norway, Switzerland and United States.

As of 2019, the Bowling World Cup has visited 42 different cities in 31 different countries.

Currently the men's champion is Francois Louw and the women's champion is Rebecca Whiting. On March 9, 2020, World Bowling and QubicaAMF announced a merger of the World Bowling Singles Championships and the QubicaAMF Bowling World Cup into one annual event, that will continue to be called the QubicaAMF Bowling World Cup from 2020 onwards. The 56th QubicaAMF Bowling World Cup was to be held in Salmiya, Kuwait at the Kuwait Bowling Sporting Club in November 2020, but was postponed to March 2021 and then further postponed to October 2021 due to the Covid-19 pandemic and then canceled all together.

Format
Qualifying Rounds
Stage 1: Qualifying Round of 24 Games, total pinfall. Top 24 Men, Top 24 Women advance to Stage 2, total pinfall carries over.
Stage 2: Top 24 Men, Top 24 women bowls 8 games. Top 8 Men, Top 8 Women based on total pinfall after 32 games advance to Stage 3.
Stage 3: Top 8 Men, Top 8 women bowls another 8 games in a round robin format, 30 bonus pins for a win, 15 bonus pins for a tie. Top 4 Men, Top 4 Women after 40 games (total pinfall + bonus pins) advance to the knockout finals.
Knockout Finals
Semifinals: First seeded bowler vs Fourth seeded bowler; Second seeded bowler vs Third seeded bowler, winners (Men and women) advance to the finals.
Finals: Semifinal winners bowl for the title. (Men and women)

Lane Pattern
For the 2019 BWC, all games are bowled on one pattern, typically a 41 foot pattern unless lane topography at the host site dictates that the pattern be adjusted one foot less or one foot more.

Previous winners

Source:

Number of titles by country/territory

Records

Winners
  Paeng Nepomuceno holds two Guinness World Records from his victories in the QubicaAMF Bowling World Cup. His four victories (1976, 1980, 1992, 1996) came in a record three different decades. He also holds the record for the youngest men's champion, 19, when he won his first of four titles in 1976. Incidentally, Nepomuceno won his titles in Olympic years.
 The oldest champions are  Remo Fornasari, 51, when he won in 1987; and  Irma Urrea, 45, when she won the very first women's title in 1972.
  Gemma Burden holds a Guinness World Record as the youngest Bowling World Cup Champion, 17, when she won in 1995.
 Two other men besides Nepomuceno has won multiple Bowling World Cup titles,  Arne Svein Ström (1977 and 1982) and  Michael Schmidt (2005 and 2010).
 Six women have each won two times,  Pauline Smith (1981 and 1993),  Jeanette Baker (1982 and 1983),  Shannon Pluhowsky (2002 and 2004),  Aumi Guerra (2010 and 2011),  Caroline Lagrange (2009 and 2013) and  Clara Guerrero (2014 and 2015).
 Baker, Guerra, and Guerrero are the only bowlers in QubicaAMF Bowling World Cup history to win consecutive titles.
 Only once has a country swept the men's and women's titles in the same year. This occurred in 1986 when  Sweden incidentally defeated Philippines in both the men's and women's finals.
 A host representative has won the QubicaAMF Bowling World Cup three times.  Bob Worrall won in New York City in 1981,  Wang Hongbo won in Shanghai in 2016, and  Shannon O'Keefe won in Las Vegas in 2018. 
 Chris Barnes (2014 men's champion) and Lynda Barnes (2005 women's champion) is the only husband-wife duo to win the QubicaAMF Bowling World Cup.
  USA is the most successful nation in the QubicaAMF Bowling World Cup, winning a combined 20 titles (11 men's titles, 9 women's titles)

Scoring

Appearances and Participation
Most Appearances, Men - 16,  Paeng Nepomuceno
1976, 1979–1980, 1982, 1985–1989, 1991–1996, 2009
Most Appearances, Women - 17,  Aida Granillo
1982-1983, 1985, 1988, 1992, 1994-1996, 1998-2000, 2002–2006, 2008
 Erik Kok has participated in the Bowling World Cup in five different decades.
1979–1980, 1985, 1989, 1995, 2005, 2014
Most Championship Appearances, Stepladder and Arena, Men - 9,  Paeng Nepomuceno
1976, 1980, 1986, 1989, 1991–1993, 1995–1996
Most Championship Appearances, Stepladder and Arena, Women - 7,  Shalin Zulkifli
1996–1998, 2000–2001, 2003–2004
Most Countries - 95 in 2004
Most Bowlers, Men and Women Combined - 167 in 2010
Most Bowlers, Men - 93 in 2004
Most Bowlers, Women - 76 in 2010

Awards
 The Bent Petersen Country Award is awarded to the country with the best combined finishes in the men's and women's divisions. It is named after Bent Petersen, who ran AMF’s international operations for 36 years before retiring in 1998. Originally known as the Country Champion Award, it has been awarded at the BWC since 1984. The first winner of the award was  Thailand.  Australia are the most recent winners. In 2000, the award was renamed in honor of Petersen. Petersen died on November 21, 2014.
 Highest Game Award is awarded in both the men's and women's division to the bowlers who had the highest one game score during the tournament. There have been 76 300s bowled at the QubicaAMF Bowling World Cup (61 by men, 15 by women).  Jack Guay bowled the first-ever 300 game in 1994, the 30th year of the AMF Bowling World Cup; while  Shalin Zulkifli was the first woman to bowl a 300 in 1997.  United States has the most 300s by a country, seven.
 The Barry James Sportsman Award and Jacky Felsenstein Sportswoman Award, awarded to one male bowler and one female bowler, is voted for by the participating bowlers. Representatives from  Canada and  Mexico have each won this award more times than any country, seven times each.

References

External links
Bowlingdigital World Cup Section
European Tenpin Bowling Federation World Cup Page

Ten-pin bowling competitions
Ten-pin bowling in Australia
Ten-pin bowling in Japan
Ten-pin bowling in the Philippines
Tenpin bowling in the United Kingdom
Ten-pin bowling in the United States
Bowling